Stanley Stutz (born Stanley John Modzelewski; April 14, 1920 – October 28, 1975) was an American professional basketball player.

Stutz, a 5'10" guard-forward from Worcester, Massachusetts, attended the University of Rhode Island where he led the NCAA in scoring three consecutive years from 1940–1942. Stutz then played three seasons (1946–1949) in the Basketball Association of America as a member of the New York Knicks and Baltimore Bullets. He averaged 7.1 points per game in his BAA career.

Stutz later coached the Washington Tapers of the American Basketball League.
Stutz quit playing in 1949, but in 1950 returned to the court as a referee in the NBA, staying until 1959. He went into the corporate world, becoming a vice-president at Tucl Cellophane Tape in New York City.

BAA career statistics

Regular season

Playoffs

References

External links

1920 births
1975 deaths
All-American college men's basketball players
American Basketball League (1925–1955) players
American Basketball League (1961–62) coaches
American men's basketball players
Baltimore Bullets (1944–1954) players
Basketball players from Worcester, Massachusetts
High school basketball coaches in the United States
National Basketball Association referees 
New York Knicks players
Rhode Island Rams baseball players
Rhode Island Rams men's basketball players
Forwards (basketball)
Guards (basketball)